Peter Jacques Band was an Italian disco band, created by French-Italian-American businessman Jacques Fred Petrus (1949–1987) and songwriter and producer Mauro Malavasi (1958–present).

Overview

They released three albums all reaching minor success but most of all opened up the US market for Italian made disco. In 1979, his greatest single hit was "Walking on Music" from the "Fire Night Dance" album. All tracks from this album peaked #6 on the US disco chart.  Other albums were, "Welcome Back" released in 1980 and "Dancing In The Street" released in 1985.
After financial problems Petrus had less means and studio time to succeed with PJB and his other projects like Change and B. B. & Q. band. In 1987, while in Guadeloupe, Petrus was assassinated and a Swiss tourist was accused of murder. After which PJB vanished.

The band is considered one of the pioneers of Italian produced Disco music in the U.S. and Europe. Still, the style of the music of the band is not an Italo disco (a specific dance music genre that developed in Europe in the 80-s). It's rather a real, "traditional" (US-rooted) disco music produced in Italy. It's clearly reflected in its "cold" dance-style sound and upbeat rhythm, and in the fact that it was mainly marketed in the US, where it gained a huge popularity.

In 2007, Turbofunk (Patrick Alavi) released "Gotta Move" which was a remix of "Dancing in the Street".

Discography

Albums
 Fire Night Dance (1978)
 Welcome Back (1980)
 Dancing in the Street (1985)

Singles

Compilations
 The Very Best of Peter Jacques Band (2007)

References

External links
Peter Jacques band biography
Leroy Burgess interview by Pete Lewis, 'Blues & Soul' September 2010

Hi-NRG groups
Italian dance music groups
Italo disco groups
Prelude Records artists